The 2023 Florida State Seminoles football team will represent Florida State University in the Atlantic Coast Conference during the 2023 NCAA Division I FBS football season. The Seminoles will be led by Mike Norvell in his fourth year as their head coach. The Seminoles play home games at Doak Campbell Stadium in Tallahassee, Florida.

Previous season
The Seminoles finished the 2022 season with a 10–3 record, going 5–3 in ACC play and finishing second in the Atlantic Division. Florida State finished the season with ten wins for the first time since 2016, appeared in a bowl game for the first time since 2019, and won a bowl for the first time since 2017. The Seminoles finished the season ranked #11 in the AP Poll and #10 in the Coaches’ Poll, their best finish since 2016.

Schedule
Florida State and the ACC announced the 2023 football schedule on January 30, 2023. The 2023 season will be the conference's first season since 2004, that its scheduling format just includes one division. The new format sets Florida State with three set conference opponents, while playing the remaining ten teams twice in an (home and away) in a four–year cycle. The Seminoles three set conference opponents for the next four years is; Clemson, Miami (FL), and Syracuse.

Rankings

Coaching staff

References

Florida State
Florida State Seminoles football seasons
Florida State Seminoles football